Maribel Yerxa Owen (April 25, 1940 – February 15, 1961) was an American figure skater.

She was the daughter of skaters Maribel Vinson and Guy Owen and the sister of 1961 U.S. Ladies' Champion Laurie Owen. With pairs  partner Dudley Richards, they placed tenth at 1960 Winter Olympics and won the U.S. national championship in 1961. Along with her mother, sister, and the U.S. Figure Skating team and coaches, Owen died in the crash of Sabena Flight 548 en route to the 1961 World Championships.

Life and career
Born in Boston, Massachusetts, Owen was the first child born to Guy Owen and Maribel Vinson. She was named after her mother, and was known as "Maribel, Jr." or "Mara".  Her younger sister Laurence was also a champion skater, both coached by their mother.

Owen began to skate before the age of three and at the time the Owen family was living in Berkeley, California, and she competed in girls' singles competitions representing the St. Moritz Ice Skating Club.  After her parents' divorce and her father's death, the Owen family moved east to the Boston area in 1952 to live with their recently widowed grandmother in Winchester. Owen formed a pairs team with Charles Foster (later president of the United States Figure Skating Association). In 1956, when she age 15, she and Foster became the U.S. junior national champions.  When Foster retired from competition to attend medical school, she teamed with Dudley Richards, a college roommate of Ted Kennedy at Harvard.

With Richards, she competed at the 1960 Winter Olympics, placing tenth after finishing runner-up at the U.S. championships. They won the 1961 United States Figure Skating Championships and the silver medal at the 1961 North American Figure Skating Championships.

On January 28, 2011, Owen was inducted into the United States Figure Skating Hall of Fame along with the entire 1961 World Team. Her sister Laurence Owen also was inducted and her mother Maribel Vinson Owen was inducted for a third time in 2011; in her capacity as a 1961 World Team Coach. Previously, her mother had been inducted in the inaugural Class of 1976 as a singles skater and for a second time in 1994 as a pairs skater.

Owen was a student at Boston University, where she was majoring in sociology and anthropology. She was also a member of Sigma Kappa sorority at Boston University.

Death

As a result of winning the national championship, Owen was selected to be a member of the U.S. team for the 1961 World Figure Skating Championships in Prague, Czechoslovakia. The team was on Sabena Flight 548, a Boeing 707, which crashed on a clear morning near Brussels, Belgium, killing all on board. Owen was only 20 years old and the World Championships that year were soon cancelled.

Owen was interred next to her mother and sister in Mount Auburn Cemetery in Cambridge. In Winchester, the Vinson-Owen elementary school was named in her family's honor.

Results
(pairs with Dudley Richards)

See also
 Maribel Vinson
 Laurence Owen
 Guy Owen
 Sabena Flight 548

References

External links
 
 Remembering Flight 548: Shattered dreams
 
 About.com  – Maribel Y. Owen – 1961 U.S. Pair Skating Champion
 

American female pair skaters
Figure skaters at the 1960 Winter Olympics
1961 deaths
Olympic figure skaters of the United States
Victims of aviation accidents or incidents in Belgium
1940 births
Figure skaters from Boston
Burials at Mount Auburn Cemetery
American sportspeople of Canadian descent
Victims of aviation accidents or incidents in 1961
20th-century American women